U.S. Catanzaro 1929 is an Italian football club based in Catanzaro, Calabria and competes in Serie C, the third tier of the Italian football championship.

The club was initially formed with the merger of two locals clubs in 1927 before being officially founded in 1929. Since then the club has primarily competed in the lower divisions of the national competitions and has been re-founded twice, once in 2006 and again in 2011, both for financial reasons.

Since its foundation the official colours of the club have been red and yellow. The team has used these colours predominantly in their kits, frequently playing in either all-red kits with yellow trims or in red and yellow stripes. The clubs official emblem is the golden eagle, in honour of the city's coat of arms. The team plays its home matches at the Stadio Nicola Ceravolo, which was built in 1919 and is the oldest sports facility in Calabria.

In its history, Catanzaro has played seven seasons in Serie A, five of which were consecutive. The best performance in Serie A was a seventh place finish in 1981–82 and an eighth place finish obtained in 1980–81.                                                

The club has won seven championships since its foundation. Six of these were in the third tier (one in Prima Divisione, two in Serie C, and three in Serie C1). The final championship was won in IV Serie in 1953. In this year, the club were also national title holders after winning the Scudetto IV Serie. At youth level, the club won the Dante Berretti Trophy of Serie C in 1991–1992.

In the Coppa Italia, Catanzaro's best results were runners-up in 1965–66, and semi-finalists in 1978–79 and 1981–82.

On 30 May 2018 the club, which already used the historic logo since 2011, announced the return of the old name "Unione Sportiva Catanzaro", with the final addition of "1929".

History

Origins to pre-World War II 
The club was initially founded by the merger of two local teams (la Braccini and la Scalfaro) as Unione Sportiva Catanzarese in 1927, and competed in the Terza Divisione interregional group of Calabria & Basilicata, which was the fourth tier of Italian football at the time. Following a visit to the city from fascist leader Benito Mussolini, the club was officially founded with the name change of Unione Sportiva Fascista Catanzarese in 1929. The club continued to compete in the Terza Divisione for the 1929–30 season where it gained promotion for a second place finish directly into the third tier, the Prima Divisione, for the 1930–31 season. After spending three seasons in this division Catanzarese gained promotion into Serie B for the first time in the 1933–34 season. They would spend the next three out of four years in Serie B, culminating with a fifteenth place finish in 1936–37. This meant the club would be regulated to Serie C for the following season, however financial troubles struck the club, so they returned to regional leagues instead. There they would win a couple of regional titles before the second world war would prevent any further competition.

Post World War II and first national title 
When competition resumed post World War II, the club dropped the fascist moniker, simply becoming Unione Sportiva Catanzaro for the Serie C season. They would remain in Serie C for thirteen of the following fifteen seasons, participating in only the Serie B once in 1946–47 and IV Serie once following relegation from the 1951–52 Serie C season. Catanzaro would bounce quickly back to Serie C after the 1952–53 season, which saw them not only win their interregional group, but also become national scudetto winners following the play-offs between interregional winners. The club would go on to become Serie C group winners in 1958–59 to achieve promotion back to Serie B for the first time in thirteen years.

Serie B consistency to Serie A promotion 
With promotion into Serie B for the 1959–60 season, the club would enter a period of stable success, competing for twelve consecutive years there, with generally mid-table placings. This period saw the club reach the Coppa Italia final in 1966, before finally winning promotion to Serie A for the first time in 1971, after they defeated Bari in the deciding fixture of a three-way play-off which also featured Atalanta.

Catanzaro's inaugural Serie A season saw them struggle and succumb to relegation on the final day with only 3 wins and 15 draws for 21 points. However, their first-ever Serie A win came in Round 16 with a 1–0 win over Juventus. After narrowly missing out on a return to Serie A in 1975, they bounced back in 1976 but once again lasted just one year.

A third promotion in 1978 ushered in the club's golden era with a five-year stay in Serie A. With a team including Claudio Ranieri, Gianni Improta and the iconic Massimo Palanca, Catanzaro managed a highly credible 9th place in 1979. Though they finished 14th and would have been relegated for the following season, they won a reprieve thanks to forced relegations of AC Milan and Lazio. They managed 8th place in 1981 and 7th the following year before a dismal relegation in 1983. Much of the next four years was spent bouncing between Serie B and C1.

Return to Serie C and bankruptcy 
Catanzaro initially emerged as promotion contenders once more in 1988, finishing 5th with the ageless Palanca having returned to the club after a fruitless spell at Napoli. However, they ultimately succumbed to successive relegations in 1990 and 1991, staying in Serie C2 for twelve seasons until 2003.

In 2005, after two consecutive promotions, Catanzaro returned to Serie B after a 15-year absence. However, after a poor season they ended their Serie B campaign in last place, meaning relegation to Serie C1. Catanzaro would immediately get another chance, the team being reinstated to Serie B due to vacancies related to the exclusion of other teams from Serie B. In its 2005–06 Serie B campaign, Catanzaro came last again and was relegated to Serie C1. The relegation was followed by financial troubles which led to the federation cancelling the club's registration.

F.C. Catanzaro (2006–2011) 

In the summer 2006 the club was re-founded for the first time with the new name of F.C. Catanzaro and was registered to Serie C2 for the 2006–07 season, with the hope to return to the upper divisions.

In season 2010–11, they were initially relegated from Lega Pro Seconda Divisione group C to Serie D, but due to the relegation of Pomezia to last place, the club was saved from relegation.

On 18 July 2011 the club was excluded by the Federal Council from Lega Pro Seconda Divisione, but on 27 July 2011 the club won its appeal to Tnas and be permitted to play in the 2011–12 Lega Pro Seconda Divisione.

Catanzaro Calcio 2011 / U.S. Catanzaro 1929 (2011–present) 
On 30 June 2011 the company Catanzaro Calcio 2011 acquired permanently the company branch of the bankrupt F.C. Catanzaro, following the cancellation of the previous club's registration because of financial troubles.
On 6 August 2011, the company purchased the historical brand and logo of U.S. Catanzaro.

In the 2011–12 season, Catanzaro obtained a respectable second place in the Lega Pro Seconda Divisione and was promoted to Lega Pro Prima Divisione after playoffs. The following two seasons saw Catanzaro ending in tenth and fourth place respectively, and also a participation in the promotion play-offs (then lost to Benevento) in the latter case.

Finally in 2018, the club officially transitioned to the name Unione Sportiva Catanzaro 1929, after years of using the historical logo. The logo was also updated with the year '1929' added to highlight this change. The club would make promotion play-offs for three consecutive years, after finishing 3rd, 7th and 2nd but ultimately remain in Serie C.

In the 2021–22 season, Catanzaro again performed strongly in the league and also in the Coppa Italia Serie C. The start of the season began slowly with a number of draws interspersed with some wins. Ultimately, by 29 November 2021 Calabro was fired following a 1–1 draw with Monterosi and was replaced by Vivarini. The team had an immediate response with two wins and drew 1–1 away to Padova in the Coppa Italia Serie C semi-final. On the return leg at home, Catanzaro lost 0–1 and Padova went on to became eventual winners of the cup. Catanzaro continued to pick up points and finished the season strongly in second for a consecutive season, gaining direct entry into the quarter-final promotion playoffs. There they defeated Monopoli 3–1 on aggregate to once again find themselves matched up again Padova in the semi-finals. Unfortunately, they were unable to progress through to final as they lost 2–1 on aggregate.

Stadium, Colours and badge
Stadium

Catanzaro plays out of Stadio Nicola Ceravolo, which was built in 1919 and is the oldest sports facility in Calabria.

Colours

The team's colours, since foundation, are red and yellow, just as the whole city

The most used uniform in the eighty years of history of the Aquile is the solid red one, with the yellow V collar with red shorts and socks with yellow edges.

Those pairings have accompanied the Calabrians in the golden years of the Serie A and therefore are the most dear to the Catanzaro environment. Equally used was the vertical striped yellow and red shirt with red shorts and socks with yellow edges, especially in the post-failure years of 2006.

Most rarely Catanzaro has used a shirt with yellow and red horizontal stripes. However, this uniform was used by the Calabrians in the historic match in Turin, won against Juventus, in the 1965-66 Coppa Italia, which was to launch the Catanzaro in the final, then lost against the lilies of Florence.

For the away shirt, the most used is completely blue with references to the Giallorossi, but also completely white or yellow seals were worn.

Occasionally le Aquile, have also used a third uniform which, depending on the color of the home squad, could be either blue or white or yellow. Same for the fourth currency

Badges

The corporate coat of arms consists of a shield in which stands the historic symbol of Catanzaro, the Golden eagle, faithfully taken from the city's coat of arms, which holds a blue ribbon on its beak bearing the motto Sanguinis effusione, motivated by the losses reported in various battles by the Catanzaro fighters.

On the belly of the eagle takes place a shield that reproduces the three hills on which the city stands. A vertical line splits the emblem in two, so as to allow the insertion of the team's social colors, which is completed by the name of the company, placed at the top on a blue background.

Players

Current squad

Out on loan

Staff

Current
As of 1 November 2021

Hall of fame 
Below is a list of players inducted into the Catanzaro Hall of Fame

Presidential history
Below is a presidential history list of Catanzaro, from when they were founded in 1927, until the present day.

Managerial history

 * Denotes took over as manager during the season

Honours

Leagues 
 Serie B (Level 2)
Runners-Up (2): 1975–76, 1977–78
Promoted via play-offs (1): 1970–71
 Prima Divisione / Serie C / Serie C1 (Level 3)
Winners (6): 1932–33 (Group I), 1935–36 (Group D), 1958–59 (Group B), 1984–85 (Group B), 1986–87 (Group B), 2003–04 (Group B)
Runners–Up (2): 1945–46, 1947–48 
 IV Serie / Serie C2 / Lega Pro Seconda Divisione (Level 4)
Winners (1): 1952–53 (Group H)
Runners-Up (1): 2011–12
Promotion (1): 2002–03

Cups 
 Coppa Italia
Finalists (1): 1965–66
Semi-finalists (2): 1978–79, 1981–82
 Supercoppa di Serie C
Runners-Up (1): 2004
 Scudetto IV Serie
Winners (1): 1952–53

European 
 Cup of the Alps
 Winners (1): 1960

Notes

Competitions

League

National Cups

International record

Cup of the Alps

Anglo-Italian Cup

Overall Record

References

External links
 Official Site 

 
Football clubs in Calabria
Association football clubs established in 1927
Serie A clubs
Serie B clubs
Serie C clubs
Serie D clubs
1927 establishments in Italy
Phoenix clubs (association football)
2006 establishments in Italy
2011 establishments in Italy